Baghcheh Juq (also Romanized as Bāghcheh Jūq) is a village in Qaleh Darrehsi Rural District, in the Central District of Maku County, West Azerbaijan Province, Iran. At the 2006 census, its population was 1,738, in 393 families. This village is populated by Azerbaijani Turks.

References 

Populated places in Maku County